Springfield High School is a historic high school complex located at Springfield, Orangeburg County, South Carolina. It was built in 1928–1929, and is a two-story, brick high school building with a projecting central and end pavilions. Also on the property are the contributing gymnasium building (1938) and Springfield Graded School Annex (c. 1927).

It was added to the National Register of Historic Places in 2001.

References

High schools in South Carolina
School buildings on the National Register of Historic Places in South Carolina
School buildings completed in 1929
Buildings and structures in Orangeburg County, South Carolina
National Register of Historic Places in Orangeburg County, South Carolina
1929 establishments in South Carolina